Fairfax High School may refer to:

Fairfax High School (Fairfax, Missouri)
Fairfax High School (Fairfax, Virginia)
Fairfax High School (Los Angeles)
Fairfax High School (Fairfax, Oklahoma), Fairfax, Oklahoma
Betty H. Fairfax High School, Laveen, Arizona
Fairfax Academy (Sutton Coldfield), formerly Fairfax School and Fairfax High School